Michel-Ange Du Quesne de Menneville, Marquis Du Quesne (c. 1700 17 September 1778) was a French Governor General of New France. He was born in Toulon, France.

Du Quesne served from 1752 through 1755, and is best known for his role in the French and Indian War. Fort Duquesne, established in 1755 at the confluence of the Allegheny and Monongahela Rivers at what is now Pittsburgh, Pennsylvania, was named for him.  It was abandoned by French forces in 1758 with the arrival of the much more powerful British Forbes Expedition, who erected Fort Pitt in its place.

He built a line of defensive fortifications to strengthen the French presence. He later returned to France.

Battle of Cartagena

In 1758 he led a French squadron out of Toulon, intended to relieve another French squadron which had been sailing to Louisbourg to provide relief to the defenders there, but had been forced into Cartagena in neutral Spain. However, Du Quesne was attacked by a British force led by Henry Osborne and two of his ships were captured, including his own flagship. The ultimate result of this action was to deny Louisbourg any chance of relief, and it surrendered later in the year.

He died in 1778 in Antony, Hauts-de-Seine.

Duquesne University was named after him.

References

External links

Duquesne University

1700s births
1778 deaths
People from Toulon
French people of the French and Indian War
French North America
Margraves of Quesne
Governors of New France
People from Pennsylvania
History of Pittsburgh
18th-century Canadian politicians